Montrose railway station serves the town of Montrose in Angus, Scotland. The station overlooks the Montrose Basin and is situated on the Dundee–Aberdeen line, 90 miles (144 km) north of Edinburgh Waverley, between Arbroath and Laurencekirk. There is a crossover at the north end of the station, which can be used to facilitate trains turning back if the line south to Arbroath is blocked.

History

The town of Montrose had initially been served by a short branch line from the Aberdeen Railway at Dubton Junction, which ran to a modest terminus close to the centre of the town and opened in 1848.

The current station was opened on 1 May 1883 by the North British Railway on their North British, Arbroath and Montrose Railway route linking Arbroath with the Scottish North Eastern Railway main line through Strathmore at Kinnaber Junction. This was essentially a continuation of the NBR main line from Edinburgh via the Tay Rail Bridge and allowed the company to accelerate its services between the Scottish capital and Aberdeen by an hour. Though the line received parliamentary approval in 1871, it wasn't until 1881 that the line was opened for goods traffic, progress having been delayed by the need to rebuild the iron South Esk viaduct south of the station. The original had been built to the design of Sir Thomas Bouch, which was considered suspect after the Tay Bridge Disaster of 1879 - upon testing under heavy loads, several of the piers failed and so it had to be replaced. Passenger traffic subsequently began on the line on 1 May 1883.

To the north of the station a chord line was laid in by the NBR to give access to the Montrose and Bervie Railway at Broomfield Junction; this 13 mile branch had been opened in 1865 and initially worked by the Scottish North Eastern Railway (whose Montrose East station it originally shared) but taken over by the NBR in 1881 when the main NBA&MR was opened. After a period of joint operation by both companies, the NBR worked all services from 1899 until the 1923 Grouping, when the London and North Eastern Railway took over. Passenger services were subsequently withdrawn by British Railways in 1951, though freight traffic continued until 1966.From 30 April 1934, services from the Dubton branch also operated to and from here with the closure of the former Caledonian terminus to passenger traffic. The station was host to a LMS caravan in 1936 followed by three caravans from 1937 to 1939. Passenger traffic on this route ended in August 1952, with complete closure following in 1963.

The section of line across the viaduct and on to Usan is the only single track section on the entire line between Edinburgh & Aberdeen - though the rest of the route was doubled by the NBR in the years after opening, the cost of widening or rebuilding the viaduct to accommodate double track was deemed prohibitive and so it remained single. Until recently, the section was worked by signal boxes at each end (Usan and Montrose South) using tokenless block regulations, but a 2010 resignalling scheme saw both boxes closed and control transferred to the former Montrose North box - this now supervises the entire area including the single line over the viaduct. The work also made the southbound platform at the station bi-directional.

Facilities 
The station is equipped with a ticket office, toilets, a car park, bike racks and a payphone adjacent to platform 1. Both platforms have benches and help points, whilst platform 2 has a shelter, and are linked by a step-free access footbridge.

Passenger volume 

The statistics cover twelve month periods that start in April.

Services
Certain Aberdeen trains are extended to either  (for Aberdeen Airport) or Inverness. Hourly trains run from Montrose to Inverurie, as part of an "Aberdeen Crossrail" plan to see hourly trains through the city.

London North Eastern Railway also operate three trains to London King's Cross as well as one train per day to Leeds, whilst CrossCountry operate two southbound trains (one to Plymouth, one to Edinburgh), but do not stop Aberdeen-bound trains. The overnight Caledonian Sleeper service to/from London Euston also stops here (except on Saturday nights/Sunday mornings).

References

Bibliography

External Links 

 Video footage of the station on YouTube

Railway stations in Angus, Scotland
Former North British Railway stations
Railway stations in Great Britain opened in 1883
Railway stations served by ScotRail
Railway stations served by Caledonian Sleeper
Railway stations served by CrossCountry
Railway stations served by London North Eastern Railway
1883 establishments in Scotland
Montrose, Angus